William Walter "Bill" Mercer (born 1964) is an American attorney and politician serving as a member of the Montana House of Representatives from the 46th district. He previously served as the United States Attorney for the District of Montana, as well as principal associate deputy attorney general for the United States Department of Justice. Mercer was nominated by President George W. Bush as Associate Attorney General and served in the position in an acting capacity, but resigned before his confirmation hearing could take place.

Early life and education
Mercer was born in Billings, Montana. He received his Juris Doctor degree from George Mason University, Master of Public Administration from Harvard University, and a Bachelor of Arts from the University of Montana.

Career
From 1994 to April 2001, Mercer served as an Assistant United States Attorney for the District of Montana. On April 20, 2001, he was nominated by President George W. Bush to serve as the United States Attorney for the District of Montana.

While remaining as the U.S. Attorney, Mercer served as principal associate deputy attorney general in the United States Department of Justice from 2005 to 2006. He later served as the acting United States Associate Attorney General starting in 2006, though resigned on June 22, 2007, in light of the dismissal of U.S. attorneys by the Bush administration. While some have alleged that Mercer was involved in the dismissal, there is no evidence that he was involved.

During his tenure as U.S. Attorney, he helped create Project Safe Childhood, a Department of Justice initiative which actively combats technology-facilitated child sexual exploitation and child pornography. The project continues to coordinate with local, state, tribal, and non-governmental agencies and organizations to protect the safety and well-being of American children.

In the Montana House of Representatives, Mercer chairs the House Judicial Committee, Law Enforcement and Justice Committee, and serves as a member on the House Appropriations Committee.

Electoral history
Mercer first announced his candidacy to the Montana House of Representatives in 2018. He won the 2018 General Election with 59.2% of the vote. In 2020, he successfully won his reelection bid, receiving 67.7% of the vote in the general election.

External links

References 

1964 births
21st-century American politicians
Antonin Scalia Law School alumni
Dismissal of U.S. attorneys controversy
George Mason University alumni
Harvard University alumni
Harvard Kennedy School alumni
Living people
Republican Party members of the Montana House of Representatives
Politicians from Billings, Montana
United States Associate Attorneys General
United States Attorneys for the District of Montana
University of Montana alumni